The U-Krew was an American R&B/hip-hop music quintet from Portland, Oregon, that saw its greatest success in 1990.  The members of the U-Krew were Kevin Morse (lead vocals), Larry Bell (producer, keyboard/drum programmer), Lavell Alexander (turntables), James McClendon, and Hakim Rashad Muhammad (rap vocals). They were originally billed as The Untouchable Krew when they were formed in October 1984.

After shortening their name to The U-Krew, the band released its only album in 1989, eponymously titled The U-Krew on Enigma Records.  The album peaked at number 93 on the Billboard 200 and included the hit singles, "If U Were Mine" and "Let Me Be Your Lover", which reached number 24 and number 68 respectively on the Billboard Hot 100 in 1990. Enigma Records folded in 1992.

Their song "Ugly" was featured in the cult sci-fi film, I Come in Peace. Hakim Rashad Muhammad and James McClendon became simply Hakim & J-Mack in 1996. In 1999, they released an album titled, Playalistic on the Portland, Oregon, based Lucky Records.

In October 2012, the U-Krew was inducted into the Oregon Music Hall of Fame, where the four remaining members did a brief performance of their hit songs.

References

American hip hop groups
Musical groups established in 1984
Musical groups from Portland, Oregon
1984 establishments in Oregon